Hans-Peter Gies (born May 9, 1947 in Berlin) is a retired male shot putter, who competed for East Germany during his career. A two-time Olympian (1972 and 1976) he set his personal best (21.31 metres) in the men's shot put event on 25 August 1972 at a meet in Potsdam.

Achievements

References
Profile

1947 births
Living people
East German male shot putters
Athletes (track and field) at the 1972 Summer Olympics
Athletes (track and field) at the 1976 Summer Olympics
Olympic athletes of East Germany
Athletes from Berlin
European Athletics Championships medalists